Pilton Community College is a coeducational secondary school with academy status, located in the Pilton area of Barnstaple in the English county of Devon.

Previously a community school administered by Devon County Council, Pilton Community College converted to academy status on 1 July 2011. However the school continues to coordinate with Devon County Council for admissions.

Pilton Community College offers GCSEs, BTECs and ASDAN courses as programmes of study for pupils. The school is also a specialist language college.

Notable former pupils
Stuart Brennan, actor and film maker
Jed Harper-Penman, footballer

References

External links
Pilton Community College official website

Secondary schools in Devon
Buildings and structures in Barnstaple
Academies in Devon
Specialist language colleges in England